The M42 Truppenfahrrad  was a military bicycle issued to the  Heer and Waffen SS during World War II. Special equipment for military use was: the steering bar, the saddle, the toolbox (which could be fitted with two  grenades) and the porter at the back. On the steering bar were holders mounted for holding a variety of items, such as a half-shelter tent, clothing, and panzerfausts. The mid-section could be fitted to hold  machineguns. The headlamp was made to work with dynamo and/or battery. 

Numerous units of the German ground forces were equipped with bicycles. In addition to aiding troops in their movement, they were also used to deliver mail and maintain connections between a general and his troops, and for other purposes.  

World War II vehicles of Germany
Bicycle models
Military vehicles introduced from 1940 to 1944
Military bicycles